The Settlers is a 2016 Israeli documentary film directed by Shimon Dotan. The film takes a critical look at the Israeli settlements in the West Bank.

Critical Reception 
Rotten Tomatoes gives the film at 95% approval rating and an average rating of 7.8/10 based on 22 reviews.

References

External links 

Israeli documentary films
2016 films
2010s Hebrew-language films
2016 documentary films